David Mark Heeley (born 8 September 1959) is an English former professional footballer who played as a left winger.

Career
Heeley began his career as an apprentice at hometown club Peterborough United. After spells at Arsenal and Northampton Town, Heeley played non-league football with Aylesbury United, Stamford and Buckingham Town.

References

1959 births
Living people
English footballers
Peterborough United F.C. players
Arsenal F.C. players
Northampton Town F.C. players
Aylesbury United F.C. players
Stamford A.F.C. players
Buckingham Town F.C. players
English Football League players
Association football midfielders